Adair Bushyhead "Paddy" Mayes (March 17, 1885 to May 28, 1963) was a Major League Baseball player. In the 5 games he played for the 1911 Philadelphia Phillies he amassed 5 at-bats, going 0 for 5 with a walk. Mayes played as an outfielder.

He was born in Locust Grove, Oklahoma and died in Fayetteville, Arkansas.

External links

1885 births
1963 deaths
Major League Baseball outfielders
Philadelphia Phillies players
Baseball players from Oklahoma
Muskogee Navigators players
People from Locust Grove, Oklahoma